"Simple Murder" is a 2003 single by East Coast hip hop group The Beatnuts. Prior to its inclusion on DJ Rhettmatic's album Exclusive Collection, Up Above Records released it as a 12 inch. Its b-side is a remix produced by Key-Kool of The Visionaries. The original version of "Simple Murder" is produced by The Beatnuts and features raps by Juju and Psycho Les. The song's lyrics are both braggadocios and hedonistic as they praise money, "bitches" and drugs in three consecutive lines. The song's beat is characterized by a repetitive funk loop sampled from "It's Not What You Fall For, It's What You Stand For" by Laura Lee.

Single track list

A-Side
 "Simple Murder (Clean)"
 "Simple Murder (Dirty)"
 "Simple Murder (TV track)"
 "Simple Murder (Instrumental)"

B-Side
 "Simple Murder (Vision Remix)"
 "Simple Murder (Remix Instrumental)"
 "Simple Murder (Acapella)"
 "Beatnuts Bonus Beat"

References

The Beatnuts songs
2003 singles